Les Mathes is a commune in the Charente-Maritime department and Nouvelle-Aquitaine region in southwestern France.

The commune includes the beach resort La Palmyre, and the Palmyre Zoo.

Population

Gallery

See also 
 Communes of the Charente-Maritime department

References

External links 
 

Communes of Charente-Maritime
Charente-Maritime communes articles needing translation from French Wikipedia